The L. A. Ring House , located at Havnevej 25, is the former home of painter L. A. Ring and his wife Sigrid Ring, née Kähler in the Sankt Jørgensbjerg district of Roskilde, Denmark. The house is located on a sloping site overlooking St. Jørgensbjerg Village, Roskilde Harbour, and Roskilde Cathedral. It was listed on the Danish registry of protected buildings and places in 2001.

The house is a private residence without public access. Ring was for a while also the owner of an adjacent property at Brøndgade 1, which was used as an extra studio. This building was converted by a private association (L. A. Rings Venner) into a visitor center under the name L. A. Rings Atelier in 2017.

History

Earlier homes
Laurits and Sigrid Ring were married in 1896. Their first home together was located in Karresbækminde at Næstved. They later moved to Frederiksværk before settling in the old school in Baldersbrønde at Hedehusene.

L. A. and Sigrid Ring's home

In 1013, Ring purchased a piece of land on Uglebjerg, a small hill in Sankt Jørgensbjerg, from St. Clare's Mill. A house designed by Ring's friend Andreas Clemmensen on the site the following year. It comprised a spacious studio. The couple lived there with their three children Ghita (1899), Anders (1900) and Ole (1902). 

Sigrid Ring died in 1923 and was buried in nearby St. Ib's Graveyard. L. A.REing continued to live in the house until his own death in 1933.

Later history
The house was then acquired by the historian Arthur Fang. It was later taken over by his daughter, aLotte Fang, a librarian and local historian.

Architecture
The house is constructed in red brick in a style that combines influences from asymmetrical Danish villa architecture of the late 19th century with influences from Romantic Nationalism and Bedre Byggeskik.

Above the main entrance are decorations with Renaissance-style masks and the interwoven initials of Sigrid and L. A. Ring. Their initials are also incorporated in the design of the rough iron garden gate.

The hall features reddish-brown and green tiles from Hakkemose Brickworks, The living room contains a stove from Kähler's Ceramics Factory in Næstved. Sigrid Eing was the daughter of the company's founder, Herman A. Kähler.

L. A. Ring's Studio
Ring bought a half-timbered house on an adjacent property in  Brøndgade with the intention of using it as an extra studio. He expanded the house but only used it sporadically and ended up selling it again. A group of local citizens from Roskilde formed an association, L. A. Ring's Cenner, with the intention of turning it into a visitor center. It was subsequently acquired by Winnie Liljeborg and put through a renovation. The visitor center opened in 2017.

See also
 Kastellet (Roskilde)

References

Further reading
 Fang, Arthur: Ring og Roskilde. Jul i Roskilde (1962)

External links
 L. A. Rings Venner
 L. A. Eing's Studio
 Source
 Source

Houses in Roskilde Municipality
Listed buildings and structures in Roskilde Municipality
Andreas Clemmensen buildings
Houses completed in 1914
Biographical museums in Denmark